Catriona Jeffries is an art gallery in Vancouver, British Columbia, that has been in operation since 1994. It focuses on the post conceptual art practices which have emerged from Vancouver and the critical relationships between these practices and particular international artists. It is recognized as one of the most important commercial contemporary art galleries in Vancouver, and one of the only ones that has an international reputation.

The gallery shows work by well-known Vancouver artists such as Ian Wallace, Brian Jungen, and Geoffrey Farmer.

The gallery has taken the work of Vancouver artists to curated art shows and fairs such as The Armory Show (2001), Artforum Berlin (2002), Art Basel Miami Beach (2005, 2006, 2007, 2009), Toronto International Art Fair (2005, 2008), and Art Basel, Basel (2008, 2009, 2010, 2011, 2017).

Artists
Catriona Jeffries Gallery represents artists such as:

 Abbas Akhavan
 Valérie Blass
 Raymond Boisjoly
 Rebecca Brewer
 Geoffrey Farmer
 Julia Feyrer
 Rochelle Goldberg
 Brian Jungen
 Janice Kerbel
 Duane Linklater
 Christina Mackie
 Myfanwy Macleod
 Liz Magor
 Elizabeth McIntosh
 Damian Moppett
 Jerry Pethick
 Judy Radul
 Kevin Schmidt
 Ron Terada
 Ian Wallace
 Ashes Withyman

References

External links

Art museums and galleries in British Columbia
Tourist attractions in Vancouver
Art galleries established in 1994
1994 establishments in British Columbia